Giannis Vogiatzis (born 12 June 1926) is a Greek actor.

Biography
Vogiatzis was born in Aitoliko, Aetolia-Acarnania on 12 June 1926. He studied at the Dramatic School at the Royal Theatre and for one space at the Industrial Degree.  He first appeared in theatre in 1955, immediately after he graduated from the school in the works of William Shakespeare, The Merchants In Venice at the Dionyssia Theatre (Theater).

At cinematography, Vogiatzis did his first appearance in 1957 in the movie Laterna, Ftoheia kai Garyfallo.  He also worked himself in many theatrical role a few times.  His rich vein of comedy that he cleaned in the back common of the broadcaster in film and television (I gitonia mas and O oniroparmenos).

Vogiatzis has acted in 68 films, mainly in comedic roles. His favourite productions include: I gynaiks mou trelathike, Mia Italida ap' tin Kypseli, Despoinis Dievthyntis, Ena koritsi gia dyo, I Marina ki o Kontia, Tha se Kano Vasilissa, Nyhta Gamou (Night Wedding), The Mother's Chile and O Mikes Pantrevetai.

Vogiatzis is the cousin and synomous of the actor and singer (artist) Giannis Vogiatzis

Filmography

References

External links

1926 births
Living people
Greek male actors
People from Aetolia-Acarnania